Faliro, also known as Neo Faliro on signage and maps, is a station on Athens Metro Line 1. It is near the Faliro Coastal Zone Olympic Complex (Peace and Friendship Stadium and the Karaiskakis Stadium). The station is also adjacent to a rolling stock depot.

Tram stops 

Two tram stops serve Faliro metro station, both of which are located next to Poseidonos Avenue:

 Gipedo Karaiskaki serves westbound Line 7 trams heading towards  in Piraeus, and is connected to the metro station via a pedestrian subway.
 Stadio Irinis & Filias, abbreviated to as SEF, serves eastbound Line 7 trams heading towards , and is connected to the metro station with a footbridge over Poseidonos Avenue. 

Stadio Irinis & Filias opened on 19 July 2004, as the western terminus of the initial network for the 2004 Summer Olympics in Athens. Gipedo Karaiskaki opened on 28 November 2019, originally as an alighting point for trams heading towards the Port of Piraeus. Both stops were closed from 16 March 2020 to 21 January 2021, due to realignment works associated with the Faliro Waterfront regeneration project.

Stadio Irinis & Filias consists of two island platforms and four tracks, and has a set of crossovers to the east, allowing trams to turn back in case of disruption on the Piraeus loop: the crossovers were also in regular use when Stadio Irinis & Filias was the terminus.

Station layout

References 

Athens Metro stations
Athens Tram stops
Railway stations opened in 1882
1882 establishments in Greece